Dr. Sumner Twiss is Distinguished Professor of Human Rights, Ethics, and Religion at Florida State University, where he holds a joint appointment between the Department of Religion and the Center for the Advancement of Human Rights.  He has also served as a Professor of Religious Studies at Brown University.  He is a leading authority on theories of religion and comparative religious ethics, and serves as Co-Editor of the Journal of Religious Ethics (Blackwell Publishing) and Senior Editor of a book series, Advancing Human Rights (Georgetown University Press).

He is the recipient of numerous awards, including Post-Doctoral Fellow of the Society for Values in Higher Education; Fellow of the Institute of Society, Ethics, and the Life-Sciences; National Endowment for the Humanities Award to co-direct a Summer Seminar for College Teachers; and a Chiang Ching-kuo Foundation Award for International Scholarly Exchange.

Published books

Comparative Religious Ethics: A New Method (co-author with David Little). New York: Harper & Row; Toronto: Fitzhenry & Whiteside, 1978. 266 pp.
Genetic Counseling: Facts, Values, and Norms (co-editor with Alexander Capron, Marc Lappe, Robert Murray, and Tabitha Powledge). New York: Alan R. Liss, 1979. 344 pp.
Experience of the Sacred: Readings in the Phenomenology of Religion (co-edited with Walter H. Conser Jr.). Hanover and London: University Press of New England/Brown University 1992. 294 pp. with 74 pp. introduction.
Religion and Human Rights (co-edited with John Kelsay). New York: Project on Religion and Human Rights/Human Rights Watch, 1994. 123 pp. with introductory material and epilogue.
Religious Diversity and American Religious History: Studies in Traditions and Cultures (co-edited with Walter H. Conser Jr.). Athens and London: University of Georgia Press, 1997, 305 pp.
Explorations in Global Ethics: Comparative Religious Ethics and Interreligious Dialogue (co-edited with Bruce Grelle). Boulder, Co. and London: Westview Press/Perseus Books, 1998. 350 pp. including introduction. Paperbound edition, 2000.

External links
 Florida State University faculty profile

Florida State University faculty
Living people
Year of birth missing (living people)